Torbjørn C. "Thor" Pedersen (born 19 December, 1978) is a Danish traveller and adventurer known for the Once Upon a Saga project: a journey to visit every country in the world without the use of air travel. The project has lasted for over eight years, and Pedersen had, visited 201 of the planned 203 nations.

Early life 
Torbjørn Cederlöf Pedersen was born in Kerteminde, Denmark, to Torben Pedersen (Danish) and Ylva Cederlöf (Finnish). The family moved to Vancouver, Canada, then to Toronto, Canada, and  after that to New Jersey, USA over a period of six years, before returning to Denmark in 1984 where he spent his childhood growing up in Kerteminde and Bryrup before entering business school at Silkeborg Handelsskole, Silkeborg. Pedersen graduated as a merchant student in 1998 and was drafted to the military later the same year, serving as a royal life guard at the royal palaces throughout Denmark. He was later a UN soldier for half a year in Eritrea and Ethiopia. Following an education in shipping and logistic the Dane worked several years abroad in Libya, Bangladesh, Kazakhstan, Azerbaijan, the United States and other countries. When travelling abroad, Torbjørn is nicknamed Thor.

Once Upon a Saga 
In 2013, Pedersen began planning a project which aimed at visiting every country in the world in a single unbroken journey explicitly without the use of air transport. Graham Hughes holds the world record of fastest visiting all countries by public surface transport, according to Guinness World Records. Hughes was however permitted to fly home to Britain twice during his journey, as long as he returned to the same airport in order to continue his journey. To visit every country in the world, in one single journey, without catching a single flight is something that has never been done before.

Through the project Pedersen intends to reach every country without flying, while promoting every country and the world in a positive way.

On 10 October, 2013 at 10:10am (10/10,10:10) Once Upon a Saga began at Dybbøl Mølle in Southern Denmark. Soon after Pedersen crossed into Germany by train and had, in January 2020, reached 193 of the intended 203 countries on all six inhabited continents without returning home.

He was originally expected to complete the project and return to Denmark again in 2020 after visiting his last country, the Maldives, in October 2020. However, he has been stuck in Hong Kong for several months due to the COVID-19 pandemic.

The long journey has earned Pedersen media coverage in more than 100 countries so far.
Notable outlets that have covered Pedersens quest between 2013 and 2020 include VICE, BBC, Lonely Planet, National Geographic, Forbes, Al Jazeera, The Guardian, News.com.au, The National and ABC.

References

External links 
 Once Upon a Saga

1978 births
Living people
Travelers
People from Kerteminde